Chapeltown railway station, originally known as Chapeltown South, is a railway station serves the Sheffield suburb of Chapeltown in South Yorkshire, England.

History
The present station was the first to be opened under the governance of the South Yorkshire Passenger Transport Executive in 1984; the original station, just over  nearer to Barnsley, closed at the same time. The platforms, shown in the photograph of the old station looking towards the new station just visible in the distance, were retained, the Barnsley-bound platform being used as a walkway to connect the original access to the new station.

CCTV was installed in March 2008 for the purposes of crime prevention. Improvements to the station included new signs, lighting, nosing on the steps, and for the first time, installation of passenger information display screens (passenger information system) to provide real-time service information.

The station featured in an episode of the 8th season of the BBC documentary series Great British Railway Journeys in January 2017 - presenter Michael Portillo began the third leg of his journey from Blackpool to Harwich there, visiting local beauty spot Wharncliffe Crags before later rejoining the train at the station to travel on to Sheffield, Conisbrough and Doncaster.

Facilities
The concrete platforms each have a "bus stop" style waiting shelter, along with timetable information boards, CIS displays and bench seating; a customer help point is located on platform 2.  Though the station is unmanned, a self-service ticket machine is provided for travellers to buy them prior to boarding or collect advance purchase tickets.  The station is not listed as accessible on the National Rail website, but there is step-free access to the southbound side via the supermarket car park and along the pathway from Sussex Road northbound (along the old station platform).

Services

See also
 Chapeltown Central railway station, on the Blackburn Valley line, about half a mile north, closed in 1954

References

Railway stations in Sheffield
DfT Category F1 stations
Former Midland Railway stations
Railway stations in Great Britain opened in 1897
Railway stations in Great Britain closed in 1982
Railway stations opened by British Rail
Railway stations in Great Britain opened in 1982
Northern franchise railway stations
1897 establishments in England